Jorge Manuel Ferreira Rodrigues is a retired Portuguese professional footballer who last played for Nõmme Kalju, as a defender.

Born in Vila Real, Portugal he played with Gorica in the Slovenian First League in the season 2008–09.

He also played in Portugal with lower league sides Vila Real, Sporting Pombal, Operário, Boavista and Tondela.

References

1982 births
Living people
People from Vila Real, Portugal
Portuguese footballers
Association football defenders
S.C. Vila Real players
S.C. Pombal players
CD Operário players
ND Gorica players
Boavista F.C. players
C.D. Tondela players
Nõmme Kalju FC players
Portuguese expatriate footballers
Expatriate footballers in Slovenia
Portuguese expatriate sportspeople in Slovenia
Expatriate footballers in Estonia
Portuguese expatriate sportspeople in Estonia
Meistriliiga players
Sportspeople from Vila Real District